Occupational rehabilitation is the science and practices of returning injured workers to a level of daily work activities that is appropriate to their functional and cognitive capacity related to their position of which may be influenced by the severity of a worker's injuries.

Professionals involved 
 Occupational therapists
 The role of occupational therapists in the workplace is to facilitate individuals' ability to return to work. Occupational therapists assist their clients in reaching their maximum level of function with the aim of meeting the physical and emotional demands of their job. Occupational therapists are also qualified to make recommendations to employers on how to downgrade job demands to meet the functional status of an employee in order to prevent further injury during occupational rehabilitation. Individual functional capacity evaluations are used to screen for person-environment fit. Industrial occupational therapists use a collaborative approach involving the workers and employers to encourage a supportive work environment that empowers the worker to reach productivity and other work related goals. Occupational therapy interventions in occupational rehabilitation include developing assertiveness; communication and interpersonal skills; controlling anger; and stress management. 
 Occupational psychology
 Physiotherapists
 Kinesiologist
 Occupational physicians
 Vocational rehabilitation

For common mental disorders 

Many workers have an increased risk of developing common mental disorders (CMDs) in the workplace due to job stressors such as job insecurity, bullying or psychological harassment, low social support at work, employee perceptions of fairness in the workplace, and an imbalance between job demands and rewards.  These CMDs may include anxiety disorders, alcohol dependence, addiction-related disorders, suicidal ideation, and depression

Approaches 
A symptom of CMDs is having disorganized and deteriorated habits. Therefore, during work rehabilitation, occupational therapists and/or other rehabilitation professionals often use a graded environment, intentionally eliminating barriers to increase individuals' performance and self-esteem. An integrative approach, based on the three key disciplines of medicine, public health, and psychology, is being utilized by occupational therapists to reduce job stressors and improve the psychological well-being of employees with CMDs. The purpose of an integrative approach is to prevent further harm to the employee and to learn how to manage the illness through health promotion, occupational psychology, positive psychology management, psychiatry, and occupational medicine.

Cognitive work hardening programs administered by occupational therapists using the Canadian Model of Client-Centered Enablement (CMCE) improve return to work outcomes of employees who have depression. Cognitive work hardening incorporates meaningful occupations or work tasks that are graded to fit individual needs within an environment that is supportive in order to improve self-worth. Cognitive work hardening programs are individualized to promote interpersonal communication and coping skills within a real-life work setting.

The Stimulating Healthy Participation and Relapse Prevention (SHARP) approach is used for individuals with CMDs who experience many sick absences from work. The SHARP approach encompasses five steps including:  listing positive and negative situations encountered in the workplace; solutions to negative situations or problems; support need for solutions; planning how to implement solutions; and evaluation of implementation

References

Rehabilitation medicine
Occupational safety and health
Vocational rehabilitation